P road may refer to :
 P roads in Belarus, republican roads
 P road in Latvia, first class roads
 P roads in Malaysia, roads in Penang
 P roads in Ukraine, state regional roads
 Corridor P, a highway in the U.S. state of Pennsylvania